Corrie Dick is a Scottish jazz musician (drums, percussion, vocals) and composer based in London. He is recognised for his fluency, gritty sound and euphoric abandon on the drum kit and for his poignant and earthy compositional style.

He comes from a small family with musical and artistic parents. His sole brother Garry Dick, two and a half years his minor, is an accomplished chef in the West of Scotland.

Band and artist associations
As well as leading an ensemble under his own name, Corrie performs and records with artists and bands such as:

 Laura Jurd
 Dinosaur
 Jasper Høiby's Fellow Creatures
 Rob Luft Riser
 Little Lions
 Blue-Eyed Hawk
 Ink Line
 Glasshopper
 Lilli Unwin Band

Corrie also plays improvised solo drum concerts and frequently collaborates with artists such as Martin Speake, Mark Lockheart, Jacob Collier, Bobby Wellins, Brian Kellock, Leafcutter John, Tom Herbert, Pete Wareham, Kit Downes, Jasper Høiby, Jim Mullen and many other notable musicians.

Education
Dick graduated as the gold medal student for the jazz programme at TrinityLaban (2010–14) where he studied composition with present-day bandmate Mark Lockheart, rhythm with Barak Schmool and musicianship with Simon Purcell. He has studied drums privately with Mark Guiliana and Kendrick Scott, traditional drumming in Morocco and kpanlogo drumming in Ghana with Saddiq Addy, nephew of legendary kpanlogo drummer Mustapha Tettey Addy. He also practices traditional world music regularly with guitarist Rob Luft, a close musical peer.

He is an alumnus of Tommy Smith's Youth Jazz Orchestra and of National Youth Jazz Orchestra of Scotland.

Awards
Having been named as 'Up And Coming Artist' in the 2012 Scottish Jazz Awards, Dick won the BBC Radio Scotland Young Scottish Jazz Musician of the Year Competition in 2013 resulting in cash prizes as well as concert performances at London, Glasgow and Skye Jazz Festivals.

Corrie was listed as 'One To Watch' in Jazzwise Magazine's forecasts for 2012 and 2016 and has twice been shortlisted for 'Newcomer of the Year' in the Parliamentary Jazz Awards - in 2015 as part of Blue-Eyed Hawk and in 2016 as a solo artist.

Other achievements
Impossible Things, Dick's debut album as bandleader, was released in November 2015 on the Chaos Collective label, which he co-founded alongside close collaborators Laura Jurd and Elliot Galvin. The album, featuring 9 young stars of the British jazz scene including vocalist/violinist Alice Zawadzki, trumpeter Laura Jurd and percussionist Felix Higginbottom and produced by Finn Peters, was lauded by numerous international reviewers including the Irish Times who said "By turns folksy, rootsy, bluesy and indy, Impossible Things announces the arrival of a new and compelling voice in contemporary European jazz."

Discography

Solo albums 
 2015: Impossible Things (Chaos Collective)

Collaborations 
 Blue-Eyed Hawk
 2014: Under The Moon (Edition Records)

 Laura Jurd
 2012: Landing Ground (Chaos Collective)
 2015: Human Spirit (Chaos Collective)

 Dinosaur
 2016: Together, As One (Edition Records)
 2020: To The Earth (Edition Records)

 Jasper Høiby
 2016: Fellow Creatures (Edition Records)

 Little Lions
 2016: Embers (EP) (Independent)

 Chaos Orchestra
 2014: Island Mentality (Chaos Collective)

 Glasshopper
 2014: Jenny (Independent)

References

External links

 Corrie Dick Soundcloud
 Blue-Eyed Hawk on Edition Records
 Laura Jurd Official Website
 Chaos Collective Official Website

1990 births
Living people
Musicians from Glasgow
Scottish jazz composers
Scottish jazz drummers
British male drummers
21st-century drummers
Male jazz composers
21st-century British male musicians
Dinosaur (band) members